Lee Ji-yeon (born February 18, 1984), known professionally as Lina, is a South Korean musical actress and singer. She was a part of the short-lived Korean R&B duo Isak N Jiyeon during 2002. After the duo disbanded in 2004, Lina eventually became a member of girl group The Grace in 2005. 

Following The Grace's indefinite hiatus in 2010, Lina established herself as a musical actress, notably through her participation in the original and Korean versions of stage musicals including Fame, Moon Embracing the Sun, Jekyll & Hyde, and Notre-Dame de Paris.

Personal life
On July 25, 2014, Lina confirmed that she was dating musical actor, Jang Seung-jo for two years. They had been seeing each other since the musical "Temptation of Wolves". They got married on November 22, 2014, in a private wedding. The two welcomed their first child in September 2018. On September 28, 2021, the agency announced that Lina is pregnant with her second child. On December 31, 2021 Lina gave birth to the couple’s second child, a daughter.

Discography

Original soundtracks

Other appearances

Filmography

Television series

Musical theatre

References

External links

1984 births
Living people
K-pop singers
South Korean women pop singers
South Korean female idols
South Korean contemporary R&B singers
South Korean musical theatre actresses
South Korean dance musicians
South Korean television actresses
SM Entertainment artists